Tadeo Zarratea Dávalos (born 28 October 1946 in Yuty) is a Paraguayan lawyer, activist, linguist, and author.

Graduated as lawyer and linguist at Universidad Nacional de Asunción, he has long advocated for the rights of indigenous people.

He became famous as the author of Kalaito Pombero, one of the first novels to ever be written in the Guarani language.

Selected works 
  
  
  (with Feliciano Acosta Alcaraz)
  
  (with Feliciano Acosta Alcaraz)

References

External links 
 Tadeo Zarratea - WorldCat

1946 births
Living people
Universidad Nacional de Asunción alumni
20th-century Paraguayan lawyers
Paraguayan activists
Linguists from Paraguay
Paraguayan male writers
Guarani-language writers
21st-century Paraguayan lawyers